In mathematics, the Weyl integral (named after Hermann Weyl) is an operator defined, as an example of fractional calculus, on functions f on the unit circle having integral 0 and a Fourier series. In other words there is a Fourier series for f of the form

 

with a0 = 0.

Then the Weyl integral operator of order s is defined on Fourier series by

 

where this is defined. Here s can take any real value, and for integer values k of s the series expansion is the expected k-th derivative, if k > 0, or (−k)th indefinite integral normalized by integration from θ = 0.

The condition a0 = 0 here plays the obvious role of excluding the need to consider division by zero. The definition is due to Hermann Weyl (1917).

See also
Sobolev space

References

Fourier series
Fractional calculus